Roman Empire is a television docudrama based on historical events of the Roman Empire. The show is in the anthology format with each season presenting an independent story. Season 1, "Reign of Blood", is a six-part story about Emperor Commodus. Jeremiah Murphy and Peter Sherman collaborated on writing the first season, with Richard Lopez directing. It premiered on Netflix on November 11, 2016. Season 2, "Master of Rome", is a five-part story about the rise of Dictator Julius Caesar and the fall of the Roman Republic. Season 2 premiered on July 27, 2018. Season 3 "The Mad Emperor" premiered on Netflix on April 5, 2019, and is a four-part story about Emperor Caligula.

The series was produced by Netflix as a "Netflix Original" series, though it frequently reuses footage from other programs, including Ancient Rome: The Rise and Fall of an Empire (2006).

Episodes
As Roman Empire is an anthology series, each season tells its own story, and each season has its own title.

Season 1 (2016)
The first season is named Commodus: Reign of Blood, and consists of six episodes. It became available for streaming on November 11, 2016.

Season 2 (2018)
The second season is named Julius Caesar: Master of Rome, and consists of five episodes. It became available for streaming on July 27, 2018.

Season 3 (2019)
The third season is named Caligula: The Mad Emperor, and consists of four episodes. It became available for streaming on April 5, 2019.

Historical people and events

Commodus: Reign of Blood

Commodus was Roman Emperor from 180AD to 192AD. He also ruled as co-emperor with his father Marcus Aurelius from 177 until his father's death in 180.
Marcus Aurelius was Roman Emperor from 161 to 180. He ruled with Lucius Verus as co-emperor from 161 until Verus' death in 169. Marcus Aurelius was the last of the so-called Five Good Emperors. He was a practitioner of Stoicism, and his Greek-language writing, commonly known as the Meditations, is the most significant source of the modern understanding of ancient Stoic philosophy.
Faustina the Younger was a daughter of Roman Emperor Antoninus Pius. She was a Roman Empress and wife to her maternal cousin Marcus Aurelius. Though Roman sources give a generally negative view of her character, she was held in high esteem by soldiers and her own husband and was given divine honors after her death.
Lucilla was the second daughter and third child of Roman Emperor Marcus Aurelius and an elder sister to future Roman Emperor Commodus.
Avidius Cassius was a Roman general and usurper who briefly ruled Egypt and Syria in 175.

Julius Caesar: Master of Rome

Julius Caesar (12 July 100 BC – 15 March 44 BC), a politician, general, and later, dictator; the season's central argument is that Julius Caesar was assassinated because wealthy and conservative elites wanted to block Caesar's reforms.
Pompey, politician and military leader who, while as ambitious as Caesar, and despite having been his son-in-law, chose to ally himself with the optimates in opposing Caesar and supporting the traditional Roman Republic.
Crassus, the richest man in Rome, who rose to political prominence following his victory over the slave revolt led by Spartacus, sharing the consulship with his rival Pompey 
Servilia, the mother of Marcus Junius Brutus and former lover of Caesar
Brutus, a Roman politician whose relationship with Caesar is deeply complex
Mark Antony, an hedonistic Roman general and politician; while Caesar was away in Egypt, Antony remained in Rome to restore order but quickly caused Rome to fall into a state of anarchy.
Cleopatra, the last ruler of Egypt
Vercingetorix, king of the Arverni tribe; he leads the Gauls in a revolt against Rome

Caligula: The Mad Emperor 

 Caligula
Gaius Caesar Augustus Germanicus (31 August 12AD – 24 January 41AD)
 Claudius

Cast

Season 1: Reign of Blood
Sean Bean as Narrator
Aaron Jakubenko as Commodus
Lisa Chappell as Faustina the Younger
Ella Becroft as Bruttia Crispina
Edwin Wright as Cassius Dio
Genevieve Aitken as Marcia
Jared Turner as Cleander
John Bach as Marcus Aurelius
Tai Berdinner-Blades as Lucilla
Calum Gittins as Saoterus
Mike Edward as Narcissus

Season 2: Master of Rome
Steve West as Narrator
Ditch Davey as Julius Caesar
Tim Carlsen as Mark Antony
Natalie Medlock as Servilia
Ben Black as Brutus
Stephen Lovatt as Pompey
Wesley Dowdell as Crassus
Andrew Robertt as Cato
Taylor Hall as Young Caesar
Jessica Green as Cleopatra
Errol Shand as Vercingetorix
Phoenix Connolly as Julia

Season 3: The Mad Emperor
Steve West as Narrator
 Ido Drent as Caligula
 Craig Walsh-Wrightson as Tiberius
 Kelson Henderson as Claudius
 Colin Moy as Cassius
 Teressa Liane  as Agrippina
 Leon Wadham as Tiberius Gemellus
 Michael Morris as Naevius Sutorius Macro
 Molly Leishman as Livilla
 Elizabeth Dowden as Drusilla
Jay Simon as Senator Regulus

See also
Gladiator, a 2000 fictionalized film telling of the life of Commodus.
Rome, a fictional account of the fall of the Republic.
The Fall of the Roman Empire, another fictionalized telling of the life of Commodus.

References

External links
 Roman Empire: Reign of Blood on Netflix
 

2016 American television series debuts
2016 American television series endings
English-language Netflix original programming
Depictions of Julius Caesar on television
Depictions of Augustus on television
Depictions of Cleopatra on television
Depictions of Caligula on television
Cultural depictions of Claudius
Cultural depictions of Commodus
Cultural depictions of Marcus Junius Brutus
Cultural depictions of Vercingetorix
Cultural depictions of Mark Antony
Cultural depictions of Pompey
Cultural depictions of Marcus Licinius Crassus
Cultural depictions of Tiberius
Cultural depictions of Agrippina the Younger
Cultural depictions of Cornelia (wife of Caesar)
Cultural depictions of Servilia (mother of Brutus)
Cultural depictions of Lucilla
Netflix original documentary television series
Works set in the 2nd century
Television series by Banijay
Television shows filmed in New York (state)
Television shows filmed in New Zealand
Television series set in the Roman Empire